Rice Girl is a 1956 Italian melodrama film directed by Raffaello Matarazzo.

Plot 
Pietro, the owner of a large paddy, recognizes among his young workers Elena, his natural daughter. He then begins to follow her and to protect her, causing misunderstandings in his family.

Locations 
The movie was shot in Cascina Graziosa in Cameriano of Casalino (Novara). (Info by the Dizionario del Turismo Cinematografico)

Production 
The film is part of the sentimental melodramas, commonly called tearjerking (of which Matarazzo was the greatest exponent), then in vogue among the Italian public, then renamed by critics with the term neorealism of appendix

It was the first film in Cinemascope and in color made by Matarazzo, it was at the time presented as a popular remake of the neorealist masterpiece Riso amaro by Giuseppe De Santis of 1949.

It was shot for exteriors in the Casalino countryside, in the province of Novara.

It is the first film shot in Italy by Elsa Martinelli on her return from Hollywood where she made her debut alongside Kirk Douglas in the western film The Indian Hunter by André De Toth.

Distribution 
The film was released on the Italian cinema circuit on January 27, 1956.

Cast 

 Elsa Martinelli: Elena
 Folco Lulli: Pietro
 Michel Auclair: Mario
 Vivi Gioi:  Elena's mother
 Lilla Brignone: Adele, Pietro's wife
 Rik Battaglia: Gianni

References

External links

1956 films
Italian drama films
Films directed by Raffaello Matarazzo
1956 drama films
1950s Italian films
Melodrama films